Tencent Animation and Comics (Chinese: 腾讯动漫) is a Chinese animation and comics website which is owned by Tencent. It was founded in 2012. In June 2019, Tencent Animation and Comics was named on the 2019 Forbes List of China's Most Innovative Companies.

History 
In March 2015, Tencent Animation and Comics announced the introduction of 200 Japanese light novels and 500 Japanese comics at the UP2015 Tencent Interactive Entertainment Annual Launch,  including the distribution rights of One Piece, Naruto and Reborn!.  On July 10, 2015, Tencent launched its mobile phone app and created e-books in collaboration with Japan's KADOKAWA Group to introduce Japanese light fiction, the first works included A Certain Magical Index and Durarara!!. On September 17, 2015, Tencent established a wholly owned subsidiary of Tencent Pictures in Beijing. And announced that Tencent animation platform has more than 20,000 comic works, certified authors more than 9000, signed authors nearly 500 people, more than 40 comics click more than 100 million.

Publish 
Tencent pays comic book writers the most basic fees. In the award, Tencent animation platform set up Tencent animation original contest and star comics award, the final winner of the contestants in addition to material rewards, but also from Japanese animation professionals guidance and direct job opportunities. In 2015, Tencent launched the dream chase program, which rewards newly uploaded works with a minimum of 100 yuan, and an incentive of 800 yuan for experienced authors to update a certain number of works each month.

Operation 
Tencent will train and observe the pre-production of comics, the work will mature using a common commercial model, including image implantation, joint promotion and advertising. When the work has a broad fan base can begin to adapt the license. Some comics need to pay to read, some comics VIP can be free to read, and VIP to buy paid comics to enjoy a 20% discount, so Tencent also launched VIP animation division paid comics and free comics.

References 

Tencent